Vetulina is a genus of sea sponges in the subclass Heteroscleromorpha. It is the only genus in the monotypic family Vetulinidae and the monotypic order Sphaerocladina.

Species
There are three species recognised within the genus:
 Vetulina indica Pisera, Łukowiak, Fromont & Schuster, 2017
 Vetulina rugosa Pisera, Łukowiak, Fromont & Schuster, 2017
 Vetulina stalactites Schmidt, 1879

References

External links 
 

Heteroscleromorpha
Sponge orders